Lysistrata, or The Nude Goddess is an opera in two acts by composer Mark Adamo. The work is based on Aristophanes's fifth century BCE play Lysistrata. The opera had its world premiere at the Houston Grand Opera on March 4, 2005. It was subsequently produced in March 2006 at the New York City Opera.

Roles

References

Operas
English-language operas
Operas by Mark Adamo
2005 operas
Operas based on plays
Opera world premieres at Houston Grand Opera
Operas based on works by Aristophanes
Works based on Lysistrata